"So Many Ways" is a song by American vocal group the Braxtons, released on July 23, 1996 as the lead single from their debut album, So Many Ways (1996). The song was written by Carl-So-Lowe, Jermaine Dupri and produced by Dupri. It was also featured on the High School High soundtrack (1996). The song charted at 83 on the US Billboard Hot 100 and 22 on the Billboard R&B/Hip-Hop Songs. It also reached the top 40 in the UK, charting at 32 and in New Zealand, the song charted at 17.

Critical reception
Larry Flick from Billboard viewed the song as an "instantly memorable chugger". He added, "Fortunately, the Braxtons' smokey contralto tones are cast within a markedly more raw and streetwise musical setting than are the more sophisticated and mature Toni's recordings." Peter Miro from Cash Box wrote, "What could be better than one entrancing Braxton, but three of them? There's a certain, original aura rising from this soulful, sirenesque chorus Toni's seasoned siblings generate on the title track to their forthcoming LP. Sounding full enough to befour women, The Braxtons seem capable of winning hearts and filling the void left by En Vogue and Jade. Deft-handed producer Dupri makes his foreground subject stand out with an infectious rhythm track and background touches ideal for girl-group profiling. Urban radio can heartily pipe this song aboard on July 2."

Commercial performance
On August 10, 1996, "So Many Ways" charted at #52 on the R&B/Hip-Hop Airplay chart. On August 17, 1996, the song peaked at #31 on the R&B/Hip-Hop Airplay chart remaining 11 weeks on the chart. On August 17, 1996, the song peaked at 22 on US R&B/Hip-Hop Songs the song remained on the chart for 19 weeks. On October 5, 1996, "So Many Ways" debuted at #83 on the Billboard Hot 100 marking it their first time charting in the Billboard Hot 100. The song spent eight weeks in the chart before leaving the chart in December 1996.

On October 20, 1996, the song debuted at #34 on the New Zealand Singles Chart. In its second week the song moved on up 13 places to #21. In its third week the song dropped 10 places to #31. In its fourth week the song moved on up 6 places to #25. In its fifth week the song moved up 7 places to #18. In its sixth week the song moved up 1 place to its peak in the chart at #17. The song charted at #27, #31 and #39 in its seventh, eighth and ninth week. The song moved up 5 places to #34 and remained for four weeks before falling to #48 on January 19, 1997 and later leaving the Top 50 spending a total of 14 weeks on the chart. On February 1, 1997 the song debuted at #32 on the UK Singles Chart. The song spent a total of two weeks on the chart at numbers 58 respectively before leaving the Top 75 on February 8, 1997 becoming their first top 40 in the UK.

Live performances and promotion
On November 16, 1996 "So Many Ways" was performed on Soul Train. The song was performed on Sky News in 1996. The song was performed at The Soul Train Lady of Soul Awards with rapper Jay-Z in 1996.

Music video
A music video was produced to promote the single, featuring The Braxtons with Trina and Tamar wearing a white two piece and Towanda wearing a white dress. The length of the video at 3 minutes and 55 seconds. The video starts with The Braxtons dancing on a stage and performing in a white room featuring a male lead. Later on the sisters are seen in wearing dresses.

Track listings and formats

 US vinyl single
"So Many Ways" (Extended Mix) – 5:17
"So Many Ways" (Extended Instrumental Mix) – 5:18
"So Many Ways" (A Cappella) – 3:51
"So Many Ways" (T.V. Track) – 3:55

 US CD promo single
"So Many Ways" (Trina's Mix) – 4:34
"So Many Ways" (The Braxtons Mix) – 4:40
"So Many Ways" (Towanda's Mix) – 4:04
"So Many Ways" (Tamar's Mix) – 4:25
"So Many Ways" (Album Version) – 3:54

 UK vinyl promo single
A1 "So Many Ways" (Trina's Mix) (LP Version) – 5:20
A2 "So Many Ways" (The Braxtons Mix) – 5:37
A3 "So Many Ways" (Tamar's Mix) – 4:58
B1 "The Boss" (Masters At Work Album Mix) – 9:41
B1 "The Boss" (Kenlou Radio Mix) – 4:13

 UK, Europe CD maxi-single
"So Many Ways" (Album Version) – 3:55
"So Many Ways" (Trina's Mix Extended) – 5:20
"So Many Ways" (Feat. Jay-Z Extended) – 5:37
"So Many Ways" (Tamar's Mix Extended) – 4:57
"So Many Ways" (Instrumental) – 5:17
"So Many Ways" (L.P. Version) – 5:14

 US cassette single
A1"So Many Ways" (Album Version) – 3:55
A2"So Many Ways" (Instrumental) – 5:17
B1"So Many Ways" (Album Version) – 3:55
B2"So Many Ways" (Instrumental) – 5:17

 Europe vinyl single
A1"So Many Ways" (Album Version) – 3:55
A2"So Many Ways" (Instrumental) – 5:17
B1"So Many Ways" (Trina's Mix Extended) – 5:20
B2"So Many Ways" (Feat. Jay-Z Extended) – 5:37
B3"So Many Ways" (Tamar's Mix Extended) – 4:57

Charts

References

1996 songs
1996 singles
American contemporary R&B songs
Songs written by Jermaine Dupri
Atlantic Records singles